James Diamond (1894–1936) was an American cinematographer active during the silent and early sound eras. Much of his work during the 1930s was for lower-budget Poverty Row companies.

Selected filmography

 The Journey's End (1921)
 Jane Eyre (1921)
 Other Women's Clothes (1922)
 Your Best Friend (1922)
 Notoriety (1922)
 Married People (1922)
 The Drums of Jeopardy (1923)
 Vanity Fair (1923)
 Broken Hearts of Broadway (1923)
 Broadway Gold (1923)
 Broken Laws (1924)
 Daring Love (1924)
 The Girl of Gold (1925)
 If Marriage Fails (1925)
 The Prairie Wife (1925)
 The Red Kimono (1925)
 The Shining Adventure (1925)
 Percy''' (1925)
 Keep Smiling (1925)
 Glenister of the Mounted (1926)
 Risky Business (1926)
 The City (1926)
 Horse Shoes (1927)
 Flying Luck (1927)
 White Pants Willie (1927)
 A Perfect Gentleman (1928)
 San Francisco Nights (1928)
 Bare Knees (1928)
 Playthings of Hollywood (1930)
 They Never Come Back (1932)
 The Night Rider (1932)
 The Texas Tornado (1932)
 Guns for Hire (1932)
 Lawless Valley (1932)
 Battling Buckaroo (1932)
 Her Splendid Folly (1933)
 Sucker Money (1933)
 Gunfire (1934)
 The Woman Condemned (1934)
 Fighting Through (1934)
 Range Warfare (1934)
 Border Guns (1934)
 The Murder in the Museum (1934)
 The Road to Ruin (1934)
 The Tonto Kid (1935)
 The Reckless Buckaroo (1935)
 Outlaw Rule (1935)
 The Outlaw Tamer (1935)
 The Circle of Death (1935)
 Border Vengeance (1935)
 The Outlaw Deputy (1935)
 The Man from Guntown (1935)
 Fighting Lady (1935)
 Blazing Guns (1935)
 Suicide Squad (1935)
 The Ghost Rider (1935)
 Aces and Eights (1936)
 Gambling with Souls (1936)
 The Reckless Way (1936)
 I'll Name the Murderer (1936)
 A Million to One (1936)

References

Bibliography
 Klossner, Michael. The Europe of 1500-1815 on Film and Television: A Worldwide Filmography of Over 2550 Works, 1895 Through 2000. McFarland & Company, 2002.
 Pitts, Michael R. Poverty Row Studios, 1929–1940: An Illustrated History of 55 Independent Film Companies, with a Filmography for Each. McFarland & Company, 2005.
 Stumpf, Charles . ZaSu Pitts: The Life and Career''. McFarland, 2010.

External links

1894 births
1936 deaths
American cinematographers